Leonard Smelt may refer to:
 Leonard Smelt (politician) (c. 1683–1740), English politician
 Leonard Smelt (British Army officer) (c. 1719–1800)

See also
 Smelt family